Joseph Hayes (August 2, 1918 – September 11, 2006) was an American playwright, novelist and screenwriter born in Indianapolis, Indiana, the son of Harold Joseph, a furniture dealer, and Pearl M. Arnold Hayes. Hayes entered a Benedictine monastery at the age of thirteen, attending St. Meinrad Seminary High School in southern Indiana for two years, though graduated from Arsenal Technical High School in Indianapolis in 1936. He married Marrijane Johnston in 1938 and they had three children: Daniel, Gregory, Jason. Hayes studied at Indiana University, along with his wife, from 1938–1941.

In 1949, his play, "Leaf and Bough", was performed on Broadway. In 1954, he wrote the novel The Desperate Hours, his most successful work. In an interview in 1987, Hayes said of the novel that his main influence was "desperation": "I wrote it in six weeks, working 16 to 17 hours a day." Regarding the home invasion that occurred in the novel, he said it "was the most dramatic thing I could think of that would relate to the most people.”

Hayes wrote the Broadway play The Desperate Hours, which won the 1955 Tony Award for Best Play, was awarded an Edgar for Best Screenplay by the Mystery Writers of America for the 1955 film version,  and received the Indiana Authors Day Award for the novel version. He was the first individual to write a novel, play, and screenplay of the same story. Hayes later wrote the screenplay for a 1990 re-make, about which he said “Since I’m the only writer who has ever done novel, play and screenplay solo from a single work of his own I can’t let anyone else at it."

Hayes co-wrote with his wife both the original novel (1956) and screenplay for the Walt Disney movie Bon Voyage! in 1962. Hayes also wrote his final Broadway play, Calculated Risk in 1962.

Among his other novels are The Hours After Midnight, Don't Go Away Mad, The Third Day, The Deep End, Like Any Other Fugitive, The Long Dark Night, Missing and Presumed Dead, Island on Fire, Winner's Circle, No Escape, and The Ways of Darkness.

Among his other plays are The Happiest Millionaire, The Midnight Sun, The Deep End, Is Anyone Listening?, Summer in Copenhagen, Impolite Comedy, and Come into my Parlor.

Hayes was awarded the Distinguished Alumni Service Award from Indiana University in 1970, and received the Honorary degree of Doctor of Humane Letters from Indiana University in 1972. Hayes died of Alzheimer's disease in 2006. Survivors included three sons, ten grandchildren, and eleven great-grandchildren.

References
 Obituary, New York Times, September 20, 2006, by Campbell Robertson
 10 Classic Mystery and Suspense Plays of the Modern Theatre, edited by Stanley Richards (1973)
 University Archives, Indiana University Libraries, Bloomington Indiana
 "The Undesperate Hayes," The Indianapolis Star, September 11, 1983, by Alice Dailey

Specific

20th-century American novelists
American male novelists
Edgar Award winners
1918 births
2006 deaths
Writers from Indianapolis
20th-century American dramatists and playwrights
American male dramatists and playwrights
20th-century American male writers
Novelists from Indiana